Central Intelligence is a 2016 American buddy action comedy film directed by Rawson Marshall Thurber and written by Thurber, Ike Barinholtz and David Stassen. The film stars Kevin Hart and Dwayne Johnson as two old high school classmates who go on the run after one of them joins the CIA to save the world from a terrorist who intends to sell satellite codes.

The film premiered in Los Angeles on June 10, 2016, and was theatrically released in the United States on June 17, 2016. Central Intelligence received praise from critics for Hart and Johnson's performances but criticism for the script, and grossed $217 million worldwide against its $50 million budget.

Plot 

In 1996, star athlete Calvin "The Golden Jet" Joyner is being honored at his high school. Halfway through his speech, a group of bullies led by Trevor Olson throws the morbidly obese nerd Robbie Weirdicht (who was taking a shower in the locker room) into the gymnasium and into the middle of the school assembly. Everyone starts laughing except for Joyner and his girlfriend, Maggie Johnson, who are the only ones sympathetic towards Weirdicht; the former even going as far as to quickly cover him with his varsity jacket in a moment of compassion. He thanks Joyner and flees in embarrassment.

20 years later, Joyner is married to Maggie and works as a forensic accountant, but is dissatisfied with his career. She suggests they see a therapist to salvage their deteriorating marriage. At work, Joyner receives a friend request on Facebook from Bob Stone, who invites him to meet at a bar. Stone reveals himself to be Weirdicht. Joyner is shocked to see that he has transformed from a morbidly obese nerd into a muscular, fit, confident man with advanced hand-to-hand combat skills.

Stone asks Joyner to review some online transactions, and he discovers a multimillion-dollar auction with bidders from radical countries, with the final bids set to conclude the following day. Stone avoids Joyner's questions and sleeps on his couch. The next morning, a team of CIA agents led by Pamela Harris arrives at Joyner's in search of Stone, who already vanished. Harris tells Joyner he is a dangerous rogue agent who murdered his former partner, Phil Stanton.

Harris tells Joyner that Stone intends to sell satellite codes to the highest bidder. Soon after Stone abducts him, explaining that he is trying to stop the criminal the Black Badger from selling the codes but needs Joyner's skills to locate the meeting place. After an attack by a bounty hunter, Joyner flees and calls Maggie, telling her to meet him at the marriage counselor's office. Harris intercepts him, telling him that Stone is the Black Badger. She warns him to not tell Maggie and gives him a device to alert them to Stone's location.

Joyner meets Maggie for their marriage counseling session, where Stone is posing as the counselor. Stone convinces Joyner to help him, so he sets up a meeting with Olson, who is able to track the offshore account for the auction to get the deal's location. Olson apologizes for bullying Stone, but fabricates his apology before once again antagonizing him. Harris calls Joyner and threatens to arrest Maggie if he fails to help them detain Stone. Joyner reluctantly betrays him, and the CIA arrests him.

As Harris tortures Stone to get his confession, Joyner helps him escape. Joyner discovers the deal is happening in a Boston underground parking garage and helps Stone steal a plane. Stone enters alone, while Joyner watches Harris entering a short while later. Assuming that she is the Black Badger, he runs after her, only to find Stone meeting with the buyer and claiming to be the Black Badger. Stone shoots Joyner, grazing his neck, to keep him safe. Stanton arrives, having faked his death, and reveals himself to be the Black Badger.

A fight breaks out, and Stanton reveals his plan to frame Stone for the crime. Stone kills him by ripping his throat out. Joyner and he make it to their 20th high school reunion. Upon arriving, Joyner reconciles with Maggie and promises to improve their marriage. The new prom king is announced to be Stone; Joyner reveals to Maggie that he hacked the school's voting system to make it happen. Olson shows up to bully Stone again, but he finally stands up for himself and punches him unconscious.

In Stone's acceptance speech he reveals he is Weirdicht, cites the importance of overcoming obstacles, and praises Joyner as his best friend. He then relives his most embarrassing incident on his own terms by stripping. Stone then encounters his high school crush Darla McGuchian, whom he proceeds to share a kiss and dance with. 

Sometime later, Maggie is now pregnant, and Joyner has joined Stone in the CIA. As a gift for his first day on the job, Stone returns Joyner's varsity jacket.

Cast
 Kevin Hart as Calvin Joyner: A former popular star athlete that went to high school with Robbie, now working as an accountant.
 Dwayne Johnson as Bob Stone / Robbie Weirdicht: A formerly bullied, overweight, morbidly obese, friendless, socially awkward high school student-turned-big bodied CIA agent and hand-to-hand combatant.
 Sione Kelepi as Young Robbie Weirdicht (body double)
 Amy Ryan as Agent Pamela Harris: A CIA agent who suspects Bob is a rogue agent.
 Aaron Paul as Phil Stanton: Bob's former partner, who is believed to be dead after apparently being killed in action.
 Danielle Nicolet as Maggie Joyner: Calvin's high school sweetheart now turned wife.
 Timothy John Smith as Agent Nick Cooper.
 Megan Park as Lexi, the waitress in the bar.
 Thomas Kretschmann as the buyer: A man who wants to buy US satellite codes.
 Jason Bateman as Trevor Olson: A former high school student who bullied Robbie in the past.
 Dylan Boyack as Young Trevor
 Melissa McCarthy as Darla McGuchian (uncredited): Robbie's former high school crush.
 Kumail Nanjiani as Jared: the airport security guard.
 Ryan Hansen as Steve

Production 
The script was greenlit by Universal Pictures in 2010, and Thurber was selected to direct and started to write the script together with Ike Barinholtz and David Stassen. Before production began, Thurber convinced New Line Cinema to buy the script and the studio became the film's domestic distributor through Warner Bros. That year, Dwayne Johnson was cast alongside Kevin Hart.

Principal photography began on May 6, 2015, and took place in Atlanta, Georgia, and throughout various Massachusetts locations, including Boston, Burlington, Lynn, Middleton, Winchester and Quincy. Principal photography ended in July 2015. To promote the film, Johnson and Hart had an Instagram war against each other on set.

Release 
The film premiered at the Regency Village Theater on June 10, 2016. Warner Bros. handled distribution in the United States, where the film opened on June 17, 2016, while Universal covered global distribution, as the film was released between June and July 2016.

Central Intelligence was released on Digital HD on September 13, 2016, before being released on DVD, Blu-ray and 4K Ultra HD on September 27, 2016.

Reception

Box office 
Central Intelligence grossed $127.4 million in North America and $89.5 million in other territories for a worldwide total of $217 million, against a budget of $50 million. Deadline Hollywood calculated the net profit of the film to be $52 million, when factoring together all expenses and revenues for the film.

Central Intelligence opened on June 17, 2016, alongside Finding Dory and was projected to gross around $30 million from 3,508 theaters in its opening weekend. The film grossed $1.8 million from its Thursday previews and $13 million on its first day. The film went on to gross $35.5 million, finishing second at the box office behind fellow newcomer Finding Dory ($135.1 million).

Critical response 
On Rotten Tomatoes, the film has an approval rating of 71% based on 184 reviews with an average rating of 5.76/10. The site's critical consensus reads, "Kevin Hart and Dwayne Johnson make for well-matched comic foils, helping Central Intelligence overcome a script that coasts on their considerable chemistry." On Metacritic, the film has a weighted average score of 52 out of 100 based on 35 critics, indicating "mixed or average reviews". Audiences polled by CinemaScore gave the film an average grade of "A−" on an A+ to F scale, while PostTrak reported filmgoers gave it a 75% overall positive score and a 55% "definite recommend".

Peter Travers of Rolling Stone gave the film two out of four stars, writing, "If you're expecting the story threads to cohere, you're in the wrong multiplex. Central Intelligence always takes the lazy way out. You go along for the ride because Hart and Johnson promise something they can't deliver: a movie as funny as they are." Ignatiy Vishnevetsky of The A.V. Club criticized the film as a "shambolic high-concept farce that doubles as a cautionary tale of where studio comedies go wrong," writing, "In spots as indifferent and self-indulgent as any latter-day Adam Sandler production ... , [Intelligence] switches back and forth from snail-paced to incoherently over-stuffed on a moment's notice, with no in-between mode." Keith Phipps of Uproxx gave the film a positive review, saying, "It all adds up to the sort of breezy, undemanding comedy that fits nicely into the summer months, and plays beautifully in endless cable repeats."

Accolades

Future
In November 2021, writer/director Rawson Marshall Thurber stated that a sequel had been in development, before being delayed in favor of the collaboration between Johnson and Hart in the Jumanji sequels.

References

External links 
 Official website
 

2016 films
2016 action comedy films
2010s buddy comedy films
American action comedy films
American buddy comedy films
Dune Entertainment films
Films about bullying
Films about friendship
Films about the Central Intelligence Agency
Films directed by Rawson Marshall Thurber
Films produced by Scott Stuber
Films scored by Ludwig Göransson
Films scored by Theodore Shapiro
Films set in 1996
Films set in 2016
Films set in Maryland
Films set in Massachusetts
Films set in Boston
Films shot in Atlanta
Films shot in Boston
Films shot in Quincy, Massachusetts
New Line Cinema films
Perfect World Pictures films
Universal Pictures films
Warner Bros. films
2016 comedy films
Films about accountants
2010s English-language films
2010s American films